The Deutsche Luftstreitkräfte (German Air Force)—known before October 1916 as  (Flyer Troops)—was the air arm of the Imperial German Army. In English-language sources it is usually referred to as the Imperial German Air Service, although that is not a literal translation of either name. Both military branches operated aeroplanes, observation balloons and airships.

Founding
The Imperial German Army created an experimental balloon company inspired by the American balloon corps they had seen while observing the American Civil War, with varying forms of organisation from 1884 to 1901 until a Balloon Battalion was finally formed. The rapid development of aeronautics led to trials of airships and the choice of rigid types built by Zeppelin and Schutte-Lanz. The first military aircraft to be acquired by the German Army entered service in 1910 and the first five aviation battalions were established on 1 October 1913.

The duties of such aircraft were initially intended to be reconnaissance and artillery spotting in support of the armies, just as balloons had been used during the Franco-Prussian War (1870–1871) and as far back as the Battle of Fleurus (1794) during the French Revolutionary Wars. The Air Battalion of the Royal Engineers, with two companies, was established in November 1911. The Royal Flying Corps, RFC with a military wing and a naval wing was formed in February 1912.

Organization
Each "FFA" unit was assigned to an army unit in their local area and usually numbered with the same number as the army they were assigned to serve. The  organization changed substantially as the war progressed, to accommodate new types of aircraft, doctrine, tactics and the needs of the ground troops, in particular the artillery. During 1916, the German High Command (OHL) reorganised  by creating specialist fighter, bomber and reconnaissance units such as single-seat fighter squadrons (hunting squadrons) to counter the Royal Flying Corps and the French .

Commanders

Fighter unit organization

The buildup of the  fighter force rapidly progressed with regular lMG 08 "Spandau"-armed production examples of the Fokker E.I following the deliveries of the M.5K/MG airframes late in the summer of 1915, with early E.Is going to aces like Max Immelmann, who received IdFlieg serial number E.13/15 in August 1915.

Following the era of the KEK units through the summer of 1916,  (hunting squadrons), established by the reorganization that started in the late summer of 1916 were fielded by four kingdoms of the German Empire. Individually - each of these units was often known by the abbreviation . The Kingdom of Prussia was predominant, with a fighter force eventually comprising 67 squadrons. The Kingdom of Bavaria formed ten of these units, the Kingdom of Saxony formed seven and the Kingdom of Württemberg four.

The Prussians established three more . On 2 February 1918, JG II formed from  12, 13, 15 and 19, with Adolf Ritter von Tutschek in command. On the same day, JG III consolidated  2  and  26, 27 and 36 under Bruno Loerzer. Finally, on 2 September 1918, the Royal Prussian  was formed from the 's  I through V and placed in charge of Gotthard Sachsenberg. Bavaria established the Royal Bavarian  on 3 October 1918, from Jastas 23, 32, 34 and 35 under Eduard Ritter von Schleich.

Unit designations

(AFA) : Artillery Flier Detachment
(AFS) ; Artillery Flier School
AFP – : Army Flight Park
BZ – : Balloon Platoon
BG – : Bomber Wing
 – : the Bomber Wings under direct control by the German Army's High Command in World War I.
Bosta – : Bomber Squadron
etc – : Post
FFA – : Field Flier Detachment, the initial flight formations of the German Army in 1914–15
FLA – : Field Airship Detachment
FestFA – : Fortress Flier Detachment
FA – : Flier Detachment
FA(A) – : Flier Detachment (Artillery)
FlgBtl – : Flier Battalion
FBS – : Aerial Observer School
FEA – : Replacement Detachment
FS – : Flight School
JG – : Hunting Wing, i.e., Fighter Wing
Jasta – : Hunting Squadron, i.e., Fighter Squadron
JastaSch – : Fighter Squadron School (also referred to as )
KEK – : Combat Single-Seater Command, a predecessor to  units
Kest – : Combat Single-Seater Squadron, a predecessor to  units
KG – : Tactical Bomber Wing
 – : the Tactical Bomber Wings under direct control by the German Army's High Command in World War I.
Kasta – : Tactical Bomber Squadron
Luft – : Airship Force
LsBtl – : Airship Battalion
RBZ – : Aerial Photography Platoon
Rfa – : Giant Aircraft Detachment
Schlasta – : Battle Squadron
Schusta – : Protection Squadron

Aircraft

Aircraft designation system

During the First World War, German aircraft officially adopted for military service were allocated a designation that included (1) the name of the manufacturer, (2) a function or "class" letter, and (3) a Roman numeral. The three-part designation was needed for a unique designation to simplify logistics support of the many types of aircraft in operation – especially as  squadrons more often than not were equipped with several different types.

The designation system evolved during the war. Initially, all military aircraft were classed as "A" (monoplanes) or "B" (biplanes). The new "C" class of armed (two seat) biplane began to replace the "B" class aircraft as reconnaissance machines in 1915, the Bs continuing to be built, but as trainers. The "E" class of armed monoplane was also introduced in 1915 – the other classes were added later as new aircraft types were introduced. For most of the war 'D' was only used for biplane fighters, 'E' for monoplane fighters and 'Dr' for triplane fighters, however by the end of the war the 'D' designation was used for all single-seat fighters, including monoplanes (and, in theory at least, triplanes).

A – Unarmed reconnaissance monoplane aircraft (for example the Rumpler Taube and Fokker M.5)
B – Unarmed two-seat biplane, with the observer seated in front of the pilot.
C – Armed two-seat biplane, with the observer (usually) seated to the rear of the pilot.
CL – Light two-seater (primarily from Halberstadt and Hannover), initially intended as escort fighters – by 1917–18, mainly used for ground attack.
D –  – single-seat, armed biplane but later any fighter – for instance the Fokker E.V monoplane was renamed the D.VIII.
Dr –  – triplane fighter (twin service test Fokker triplanes initially "F")
E –  – armed monoplane – initially included monoplane two-seaters. New monoplane types at the end of the war designated as "D" (single seat) or "CL" (two seat).
G –  – Large twin-engined types, mainly bombers (initially "K")
GL –     Lighter, faster twin-engined bombers, intended for use by day.
J –  – Fuel tanks, pilot, and (usually) the engine protected by armour plate, reducing vulnerability to ground fire. Used for low-level work, especially ground attack.
N –      "C" type aircraft adapted for night bombing – apart from night flying equipment they were fitted with wings of greater span to increase bomb load.
R –  – "Giant" aircraft – at least three, up to four to six engines – all serviceable in flight.

Most manufacturers also had their own numbering systems quite separate from the official military designations for their products. These sometimes cause confusion – for instance the military "J" series of armored aircraft designs was quite distinct from the Junkers aviation firm's own "J" factory type designations – the factory designation of the (military) Junkers J.I armored, all-metal sesquiplane, for example, was the Junkers J.4. The latter has no direct connection with the official Third Reich-era German "V" designation, also signifying , for prototype aircraft, promulgated by the RLM from 1935.

The  maritime aviation service used manufacturers' designations rather than the systematic  system described above. Similarly, the sizable number of German seaplane designs from Flugzeugbau Friedrichshafen, were all known in naval service by their "FF" factory designations.

Army and navy airships were individually numbered, in the same way as contemporary German destroyers and submarines, and were outside any system of "type" designation.

Pilots

With 80 confirmed kills he is considered the most successful fighter pilot of the war. The very first "confirmed" German aerial fighter victory of the war credited to a synchronized-gun-equipped aircraft went to Leutnant Kurt Wintgens on 15 July 1915, after downing two similar Morane-Saulnier L parasol monoplanes to the victim on July 15, one each on July 1 and 4th that remained unconfirmed - this fortnight of unprecedented German aerial victories initiated the period of the Fokker Scourge. Other notable German pilots from the Fokker Scourge onwards included Ernst Udet, Erich Löwenhardt, Werner Voss, Josef Jacobs, Lothar von Richthofen, Wilhelm Frankl, Hermann Göring, Max Immelmann and the master aerial tactician Oswald Boelcke (the latter pair were the first to be awarded the Pour le Mérite, the highest decoration for gallantry for officers in the German Empire: simultaneously, on 12 January 1916, after shooting down eight Allied aeroplanes each). The award to Immelmann may have caused the decoration to acquire its popular nickname, the "Blue Max". With more and more pilots reaching this mark the required air victories were steadily increased to about 30 in 1918. In total 76 airmen were awarded the Pour le Mérite. 69 airmen received the "Goldenes Militär-Verdienst-Kreuz" (Military Merit Cross), the highest Prussian bravery award for non-commissioned officers and enlisted men. Among them were Gottfried Ehmann, the highest scoring air gunner of the war (12 victories). About 391 German pilots are credited with shooting down at least five Allied aircraft.

Insignia

The , a black Greek cross on white, replaced the earlier marking from late March 1918 (especially in early April — Richthofen's last Dr.I, 425/17, was changed over just before he was killed), although the last order on the subject, standardising the new national marking, was dated 25 June 1918.

Final year
Between January and September 1918 German pilots shot down 3,732 Allied planes while losing 1,099 aircraft. By the end of the war, the German Army Air Service possessed a total of 2,709 frontline aircraft, 56 airships, 186 balloon detachments and about 4,500 flying personnel. After the war ended in German defeat (→ Armistice of 11 November 1918), the service was dissolved completely on 8 May 1920 under the conditions of the Treaty of Versailles (Article 198), which demanded that its aeroplanes be completely handed over to the Allies (Art. 202).

Statistics

German casualties totalled 4,579 aircrew and 299 ground personnel killed, 1,372 missing/prisoner and 5,123 wounded, along with 1,962 men killed in flying accidents in Germany. Material losses by enemy action were 3,126 aircraft, 546 balloons and 26 airships. Although adding up all of the confirmed kills by allied aces, gives a total of a little under 5,000 German aircraft destroyed, as well a 600 observation balloons to just 3,000 allied planes and 370 observation balloons.
According to other sources, the Luftstreitkräfte shot down 7,783 allied aircraft (7,425 Western Front, 358 Eastern Front) and 614 captive balloons. In addition, 1,588 allied aircraft and 2 airships were shot down by german anti-aircraft guns.

See also
 German Air Force
 Luftstreitkräfte der NVA
 Luftwaffe

Notes

References

Sources

External links
 http://www.spartacus-educational.com/FWWgaas.htm
 Der Vormarsch der Flieger Abteilung 27 in der Ukraine (The advance of Flight Squadron 27 in the Ukraine). This portfolio, comprising 263 photographs mounted on 48 pages, is a photo-documentary of the German occupation and military advances through the southern Ukraine in the spring and summer of 1918.
 Die deütschen Luftstreitkräfte im Weltkriege edited by Georg Paul Neumann 1920 [German][Books google].

.01
German military aviation
Disbanded air forces
Army aviation units and formations
Aviation in World War I
German Army (German Empire)
German Empire in World War I
Military history of Germany
Military of the German Empire
Military of the German Empire by branch
1916 establishments in Germany
1920 disestablishments in Germany
Military units and formations established in 1916
Military units and formations disestablished in 1920
20th-century German aviation